Centum denotes a class within the Indo-European language family, distinguished from the satem languages.

Centum may also refer to:

 Centum City, an urban development in Busan, South Korea
 Jalaa language, or Cèntûm, an endangered language isolate of Nigeria
 Centum Investments, an East African investment company

See also